Sanguinet (Sanguinet in Occitan) is a commune in the Landes department in Nouvelle-Aquitaine in southwestern France. It is situated next to Étang de Cazaux et de Sanguinet.

Geography
The commune is situated in the north of the department of Landes. The river Gorgue passes through the village and this river is the source of the lake. It would have originally flowed into the Atlantic Ocean, but the mouth of the river was blocked over the centuries by sand dunes on the coast and thus creating the lake and many others along Landes' Atlantic Coast. The lake has covered previous sitings of a town many centuries ago.

Population

Twin Town
Sanguinet is twinned with the town of Neyland in Pembrokeshire, Wales.

See also
Communes of the Landes department

References

Communes of Landes (department)